Wu-Chronicles is a compilation album by American hip hop group Wu-Tang Clan and their affiliates. It was released on March 23, 1999 via Wu-Tang/Priority Records and includes several previously released tracks performed, produced or featured by Wu-Tang artists. Its sequel, Wu-Chronicles Chapter II, was released in 2001.

Track listing

Notes
 signifies an uncredited songwriter
 signifies a co-producer

Charts

References

External links

Wu-Tang Clan albums
Albums produced by RZA
1999 compilation albums
Hip hop compilation albums
Albums produced by Easy Mo Bee
Albums produced by Havoc (musician)
Priority Records compilation albums